Hansjörg Eichler (1 April 1916 – 22 June 1992) was a German-born botanist, educated in Europe, who worked in Europe and Australia, and whose greatest contribution was to Australian botany.

Life
Hansjörg Eichler, the son of architect, Gustav Eichler, and painter, Anna Eichler (née Sellin), was born in Ravensburg in 1916. At the Ravensburg school, one of his teachers was Karl Bertsch, a leading Württemberg botanist, who stimulated his interest in botany and took him on private botanical excursions. In 1936, the family moved to Berlin, and Eichler started working at the Botanisches Museum Berlin-Dahlem (as a volunteer) under the tutelage of Friedrich Ludwig E Diels, at the same time having enrolled at the University of Berlin, to study botany and chemistry. The work at the Botanisches Museum ceased in 1943 when a bombing raid wrecked the museum. In 1944, he was exempted from war service to allow him to both study and work at the Kaiser-Wilhelm-Institut für Kulturpflanzenforschung (now the Leibniz-Institut für Pflanzengenetik und Kulturpflanzenforschung) in Vienna.

After the war (1946–1949), he was able to continue his studies at the University of Halle-Wittenberg, and, in 1950, received his Doctorate in Natural Sciences for a thesis on floristic and phyto-oenological investigations into the Hakel. He married Marie-Louise Möhring in 1953, and went to Parma, and from there to the Nationaal Natuurhistorisch Museum Naturalis in Leiden, to work on Ranunculaceae.

In 1955, he was appointed the first Keeper of the State Herbarium of South Australia (1955–1972), and then curator of the Herbarium Australiense (which later became the Australian National Herbarium), within the CSIRO division of Plant Industry, a position held from 1973 until his retirement in 1981. In Canberra, he founded the journal, Brunonia.

In 1993 the Australian Systematic Botany Society established the Hansjörg Eichler Research Fund in his honour, and makes awards for projects contributing to Australian systematic botany. His personal herbarium of over 24, 000 specimens was divided between the State Herbarium of South Australia and the Australian National Herbarium.

Work
In addition to his contributions to botany in his roles at the State Herbarium of South Australia and later at the Australian National Herbarium, he contributed both nationally and internationally via service on many committees: 
Committee for Spermatophyta, International Association for Plant Taxonomy (1968–1992)
Committee for Nomina Conservanda, International Association for Plant Taxonomy (1975–1981)
Special committee for Orthography, International Association for Plant Taxonomy (1982–1987)
Editorial committee World Pollen and Spore Flora (1972–1975)
Advisory committee, Australian Journal of Botany (1972–1977)
Editorial committee, Index Holmensis (1974–1992)
Chair, editorial board, Brunonia (1977–1982)
Editorial committee, Flora of Australia (1980–1985)

Selected publications
(1958) Revision der Ranunculaceen Malesiens. Stuttgart. (Trove listing – book)
 – & Black, J.M. (1965) Supplement to J.M. Black's Flora of South Australia. (2nd Edition, 1943–1957). W.L. Hawes. 
 (1963) Some New Names and New Combinations Relevant to the Australian Flora. Taxon 12: 295–297. 
 Benl, G, & – (1982) Ptilotus pedleyanus, a new species of Amaranthaceae from Queensland. Brunonia 4(2): 199–207.

Published names
APNI gives some 91 published names. IPNI (with duplication) lists 152.

Honours
 In 1979, he was awarded the Willdenow Medal (awarded by the Berlin-Dahlem Herbarium) for his work towards the restoration of Berlin-Dahlem Herbarium.

Some plants named for him
Chionogentias eichleri L.G.Adams (Gentianaceae) Austral. Syst. Bot. 8(5): 973 (1995)
Picris eichleri Lack & S.Holzapfel (Asteraceae)  Willdenowia 23(1–2): 188. (1993)
Ptilotus eichlerianus Benl (Amaranthaceae) Mitteilungen der Botanischen Staatssammlung München 7: 310. (1970)
Ranunculus eichlerianus B.G.Briggs (Ranunculaceae) Proceedings of the Linnean Society of New South Wales 84: 313 (1959)

See also
Taxa named by Hansjörg Eichler
Conn, B.J. (1981) 'Dr Hans-Jörg Eichler, on the occasion of his retirement', Australian Systematic Botany Society Newsletter, vol. 26, pp. 18–43. 
Orchard, A. E. (1995) 'Hansjörg Eichler (1916–1992)', Taxon, vol. 44, pp. 271–8. 
Orchard, Tony (2015) 'Memories of Hansjörg Eichler', Australasian Systematic Botany Society Newsletter, vol. 165, pp. 49–53. 
Robertson, Enid L. (1993) 'Hansjörg Eichler 1 April 1916 – 22 June 1992', Journal of the Adelaide Botanic Gardens, vol. 15, no. 81–5.

References

20th-century Australian botanists
20th-century German botanists
1916 births
1992 deaths
Australian Botanical Liaison Officers